Stavroupoli (literally city of the Cross) is a suburb of the Thessaloniki Urban Area and was a former municipality in the regional unit of Thessaloniki, Greece. Since the 2011 local government reform it has been part of the municipality Pavlos Melas, of which it is the seat and a municipal unit. The population at the 2011 census was 46,008. The municipal unit has an area of 3.175 km2. Stavroupoli is located northwest of Thessaloniki's city centre.

Demographics
According to the 2011 census, the population of the Municipality of Pavlos Melas was 98,870, the third most populated municipality of Thessaloniki. The Stavroupoli region includes the areas of:
Τερψιθέα (Terpsithea)
Πρόνοια (Welfare)
Αμπελώνες (Vineyards)
Άνω Ηλιούπολη (Upper Ilioupoli)
Κάτω Ηλιούπολη (Lower Ilioupoli)
Νεόκτιστα (New City)
Άνωθεν Ασύλου (Upper Asylum)
Νικόπολη (Nikopoli)
Ομόνοια (Omonia)

The town is served by buses 27, 34 and 56.

The town hall is located at Karaoli & Dimitriou 1.

The area was also home to a military camp-converted-concentration camp during WWII, known in German as "Konzentrationslager Pavlo Mela" (Pavlos Melas Concentration Camp), where Jews, members of the Greek resistance and other anti-fascists were held either to be killed or sent to other concentration camps. Today the buildings are under restoration with a plan of construction of a museum.

Historical population

Notable people 
George Papassavas (1924), painter

References

External links
Official website 

Populated places in Thessaloniki (regional unit)